Kismet Love Paisa Dilli is a 2012 Bollywood comedy thriller film directed by Sanjay Khanduri. The film features Vivek Oberoi opposite Malika Sherawat in lead roles. It was released on 5 October 2012.

Plot

The film is set on a winter night in Delhi where a middle class, Delhi university guy falls in love with a girl anchoring a fashion show. In the process of wooing her, someone plants a sting operation tape in his pocket. This sting operation has a minister talking of buying and selling MLAs and media heads from his Swiss bank accounts. Unknowing, he is chased by corrupt cops and good guys to get that tape back. Soon he gets to know of tape with him and its high relevance. How this university student who always talked against corruption like any layman, now gets bribed himself by the big offer thrown by Minster's man constitutes the edge of the seat climax of story.

Cast
 Vivek Oberoi as Lokesh Duggal (Lucky)
 Mallika Sherawat as Lovina
 Neha Dhupia as Anamika aka Aarti Uttaroo
 Ashutosh Rana as Kaptan Sahab
 Ashutosh Kaushik as Bhati
 Anshuman Jha as Nunna
 Navin Kaushik as Shishodiya
 Bobby Vats as Rohit Pichhwadiya
 Sashikant Sharma as Manohar Achari
 Ashok Samarth
 Aseem Hattangady as Police Inspector Dhondiyal
 Pramod Pathak as P.A
 Rubina as Metro Girl
 Vishwanath Chatterjee as Popli
 Megh Pant as Sardar
 Meenal Kapoor as Sardarni
 Tahir Raj Bhasin as Bamby
 Lakha Lakhwinder Singh

Box office
Kismat Love Paisa Dilli barely recovered its money as it was neither released internationally nor on satellite due to ownership legalities.
It's nett gross was  8.41 crore and declared just break even by the Box Office India

Soundtrack 

The soundtrack was composed by Amjad Nadeem and Santokh Singh, with lyrics written by Shabbir Ahmed and Santokh Singh.

Awards
2013 : The Golden Palm for Best Director in Mexico International Film Festival.
2013 : Chosen for screening in 17th Annual Vancouver International Asian Film Festival in Vancouver.
2014 : Awarded medal of honour for 'Original Screenplay' in New York Film Festival.

References

 Golden Palm - Best Director: Mexico Int. Film Festival
 New York Festival 2014
 
 Filmfare Magazine
Global Movie Magazine : Superb film gone unnoticed

External links
 

2010s comedy thriller films
2010s Hindi-language films
Indian sequel films
Indian comedy thriller films
2012 comedy films
2012 films